Edward Allen Mickelson (born September 9, 1926) is an American retired professional baseball player. The ,  Mickelson, a right-handed hitting first baseman, had an 11-season career, all but 18 games of it spent in minor league baseball. His 18 Major League games played took place during three separate trials for the St. Louis Cardinals, St. Louis Browns and Chicago Cubs. On September 27, 1953, Mickelson drove in the final run in St. Louis Browns history.

Mickelson was born in Ottawa, Illinois on September 9, 1926, and attended Washington University in St. Louis and Oklahoma State University. He signed with the Cardinals in 1947 and was given his first big-league audition at the end of the 1950 minor league season, during which he batted a composite .413 in two Class B leagues. Mickelson collected only one hit and two bases on balls in 12 plate appearances over five games, however, and returned to the minor leagues for almost three full seasons.

Acquired by the Browns' organization, Mickelson was called up in September 1953 after a season spent in the Double-A Texas League. The Browns were at the end of their 52-year stay in St. Louis; owner Bill Veeck was about to sell the team to an ownership group from Baltimore and the team would be reborn as the Orioles the next season. In the third inning of the Browns' final game on Sunday, September 27, at Busch Stadium, facing the Chicago White Sox, Johnny Groth doubled off Billy Pierce with two out. Mickelson then drove home Groth with an opposite-field single to give the Browns a 1–0 lead. But Chicago came back to tie the game in the eighth, sent the contest to extra innings, and won it 2–1 with a run in the top of the 11th. The RBI single was Mickelson's last big-league hit; he went hitless for the rest of that game, and then was 0-for-12 in his last Major League stint with the 1957 Cubs.

Mickelson never appeared for the Orioles. His early-season 1957 stay with the Cubs punctuated four more minor league seasons at the Double-A and Open Classification levels. Although Mickelson collected only three hits, including a double, in 37 MLB at bats (with four bases on balls), he batted .316 with 1,374 hits during his minor-league career.

References

External links

Baseball Reference (Minors)
Retrosheet
Venezuelan Professional Baseball League

1926 births
Living people
Baseball players from Illinois
Chicago Cubs players
Columbus Cardinals players
Columbus Red Birds players
Decatur Commodores players
Houston Buffaloes players
Industriales de Valencia players
Lynchburg Cardinals players
Major League Baseball first basemen
Montgomery Rebels players
New Orleans Pelicans (baseball) players
People from Ottawa, Illinois
Pocatello Cardinals players
Portland Beavers players
Rochester Red Wings players
St. Louis Browns players
St. Louis Cardinals players
San Antonio Missions players
Shreveport Sports players
Oklahoma State Cowboys baseball players
Washington University Bears baseball players